"That's How People Grow Up" is a 2008 single by British singer Morrissey. The song, released on 4 February 2008, was used to promote his latest Greatest Hits album. The song also appears on his 2009 album Years of Refusal.

The song was composed by long-time Morrissey guitarist and musical director Boz Boorer, which made this his first composition to be released as a single since "Satan Rejected My Soul", taken from the album Maladjusted (1997). The song made its television debut on the Late Show with David Letterman, and received its first radio play on Zane Lowe's Radio 1 show on 17 December. Prior to release, it featured on the BBC Radio 2 A-list, receiving around 20 plays per week.

On 10 February 2008, "That's How People Grow Up" entered the UK Singles Chart at number 14. Four days later it also entered the Swedish singles chart, at number 26.

Track listing

7": Decca / 4780363
 "That's How People Grow Up"
 "The Boy with the Thorn in His Side" (live in Omaha, 11 May 2007)

7": Decca / 4780364
 "That's How People Grow Up"
 "Why Don't You Find Out for Yourself" (live in Salt Lake City, 15 October 2007)

CD: Decca / 4780362
 "That's How People Grow Up"
 "The Last of the Famous International Playboys" (live in NYC, 27 October 2007)

Musicians
 Morrissey - vocals
 Boz Boorer - guitar
 Jesse Tobias - guitar
 Solomon Walker - bass guitar
 Matt Walker - drums
 Michael Farrell - keyboard
 Kristeen Young - backing vocals

References

2008 singles
Morrissey songs
Songs written by Morrissey
Songs written by Boz Boorer
2007 songs
Decca Records singles